Patrick Hegarty (26 December 1926 – 31 October 2002) was an Irish Fine Gael politician and farmer. He was elected to Dáil Éireann as a Fine Gael Teachta Dála (TD) for the Cork North-East constituency at the 1973 general election, and was re-elected in 1977. In 1981 he was elected for the Cork East constituency, and was re-elected there at each subsequent election until he was defeated at the 1989 general election. 

He also stood unsuccessfully as a candidate at the 1992 general election. He was appointed a Minister of State by the Taoiseach Garret FitzGerald, serving as Minister of State at the Department of Agriculture from 1982 to 1987 and Minister of State at the Department of Industry and Commerce from 1986 to 1987.

References

1926 births
2002 deaths
Fine Gael TDs
Members of the 20th Dáil
Members of the 21st Dáil
Members of the 22nd Dáil
Members of the 23rd Dáil
Members of the 24th Dáil
Members of the 25th Dáil
Politicians from County Cork
Irish farmers
Ministers of State of the 24th Dáil